Obidim is a village (село) in southwestern Bulgaria, located in the Bansko Municipality  of the Blagoevgrad Province in Pirin mountain 15 kilometers southeast of Bansko and 52 km southeast of Blagoevgrad.

As of 2006 it has 141 inhabitants. The village was founded in the 14th century. During the Ottoman rule, the local population strongly preserved the Bulgarian patriotic spirit and as a result the village was burned down in 1903 and 1912 when it was finally liberated. 
In the land of the village has a total of 13 churches, chapels, iconostasis and a monastery. Church of Saint Nicholas Chudotvorets was built in 1842 and consecrated in 1843.

Obidim Peak on Trinity Peninsula in Antarctica is named after the village.

References

External links
 Obidim village internet page 

Villages in Blagoevgrad Province